Sir Marmaduke Wyvill, 1st Baronet (1542–1617) was an English politician. He was a Member of Parliament for Richmond in 1584 and again in 1598 and the first of the Wyvill baronets. He was the first MP for Richmond and resided at Constable Burton Hall.

Family
Sir Marmaduke was the first son of Christopher Wyvell of Constable Burton by Margaret, the daughter of John Scrope of Hambleden, Buckinghamshire.  He was educated at Pembroke College, Cambridge (1566).  He was at Lincolns Inn (1560).

Sir Marmaduke married Magdalen Danby, daughter of Sir Christopher Danby of Farnley, Yorkshire.  They had six sons and four daughters.

References

1542 births
1617 deaths
English MPs 1584–1585
English MPs 1597–1598
Baronets in the Baronetage of England
People from Richmondshire (district)
Members of the Parliament of England for constituencies in Yorkshire
17th-century English people